Walter Jenkin Evans (1 April 1856 – 10 February 1927) was a Welsh academic who served as Principal of Carmarthen Presbyterian College and who wrote about the history and people of Unitarianism in Carmarthen.

Life
Evans was born on 1 April 1856 at Carmarthen, south Wales. After schooling in Parc-y-felfed and at grammar school in Carmarthen, he went to Carmarthen Presbyterian College from 1870–73, then to Jesus College, Oxford, and Manchester College, Oxford, obtaining his BA in 1878 and his MA in 1880.

After teaching in London and in Brighton from 1879 to 1884, he returned to Carmarthen Presbyterian College in 1884 as tutor in Latin and Greek.  In 1888, he became Principal (the appointment attracting some controversy at the time on theological grounds).  He helped to establish good links between the college and the University of Wales during his time in office, and served as Dean of Divinity for the University from 1910 to 1913.  He died on 10 February 1927.

Works
Whilst Evans published some research on Latin poetry (Alliteratio Latina, or Alliteration in Latin Verse, 1921), his main work was on the history of Unitarianism.  He wrote on the history of Carmarthen Academy and on the history of Unitarianism in Carmarthen, and also penned biographies of Unitarian students from Carmarthen.  The National Library of Wales holds six manuscript volumes of his biographies and notes on the history of his denomination.

References

1856 births
1927 deaths
Welsh Unitarians
19th-century Welsh historians
20th-century Welsh historians
People from Carmarthen
Alumni of Jesus College, Oxford
Alumni of Harris Manchester College, Oxford